The 1981 Avon Championships of Dallas was a women's tennis tournament played on indoor carpet courts at the Moody Coliseum in Dallas, Texas that was part of the 1981 Virginia Slims World Championship Series. It was the 10th edition of the tournament, held from March 9 through March 15, 1981. Top-seeded Martina Navratilova won the singles title and earned $33,000 first-prize money.

Finals

Singles
 Martina Navratilova defeated  Pam Shriver 6–2, 6–4
 It was Navratilova's fourth singles title of the year and the 49th of her career.

Doubles
 Martina Navratilova /  Pam Shriver defeated  Kathy Jordan /  Anne Smith 7–5, 6–4

Prize money

References

External links
 International Tennis Federation (ITF) tournament edition details

Avon Championships of Dallas
Virginia Slims of Dallas
Avon Championships of Dallas
Avon Championships of Dallas
Dallas
Avon Championships of Dallas